Steven Spurrier is the name of:

 Steven Spurrier (artist) (1878–1961), British artist and painter
 Steven Spurrier (wine merchant) (1941–2021), British wine expert and merchant

See also 
 Steve Spurrier (born 1945), American football player and coach